Justice Hamarsan Singh Thangkhiew (born 24 December 1966) is an Indian judge. Presently, he is judge of Meghalaya High Court. He has also served as Acting Chief Justice of Meghalaya High Court.

References 

Indian judges
1966 births
Living people